The A12 is a Controlled-access highway in Portugal. The entire 41 km (25 mile) route is in the Lisbon metropolitan area, connecting the District of Lisbon with the District of Setúbal via the Vasco da Gama Bridge, the largest bridge in the European Union. It is maintained by Brisa, except for the Vasco da Gama Bridge, which is managed by Lusoponte

References 

Motorways in Portugal